Leptosillia is a fungal genus in the monogeneric family Leptosilliaceae. The genus was circumscribed by Austrian mycologist Franz Xaver Rudolf von Höhnel in 1928. The genus was monotypic for a long time, containing only the type species, Leptosillia notha. Molecular phylogenetic analysis published in 2019 showed that the genus belongs to the order Xylariales, and that the genus Cresporhaphis should be included in Leptosillia. These analyses placed Leptosillia as a sister taxon to family Delonicicolaceae, and so a new family, Leptosilliaceae, was circumscribed to contain it.

Species
Leptosillia acerina 
Leptosillia cordylines  – China
Leptosillia fusariospora 
Leptosillia macrospora 
Leptosillia mayteni 
Leptosillia muelleri 
Leptosillia notha 
Leptosillia pinicola 
Leptosillia pistaciae 
Leptosillia slaptonensis 
Leptosillia wienkampii

References

Xylariales
Sordariomycetes genera
Taxa named by Franz Xaver Rudolf von Höhnel
Taxa described in 1928